Pimus is a genus of North American tangled nest spiders first described by R. V. Chamberlin in 1947.

Species
 it contains ten species, all found in United States:
Pimus desiccatus Leech, 1972 – USA
Pimus eldorado Leech, 1972 – USA
Pimus fractus (Chamberlin, 1920) – USA
Pimus hesperellus Chamberlin, 1947 – USA
Pimus iviei Leech, 1972 – USA
Pimus leucus Chamberlin, 1947 – USA
Pimus napa Leech, 1972 – USA
Pimus nawtawaketus Leech, 1972 – USA
Pimus pitus Chamberlin, 1947 – USA
Pimus salemensis Leech, 1972 – USA

References

Amaurobiidae
Araneomorphae genera
Spiders of the United States